William H. Huff III (born June 24, 1937) was an American politician in the state of Iowa.

Huff was born in Davenport, Iowa. He was a lawyer. He served in the Iowa House of Representatives from 1969 to 1971 as a Republican.

References

1937 births
Living people
People from Davenport, Iowa
Iowa lawyers
Republican Party members of the Iowa House of Representatives